Nós–Unidade Popular (We–People's Unity) was a Galician left-wing Galician independentist political party. It was formed by the merger of Assembleia da Mocidade Independentista, Primeira Linha and other organizations. Nós–UP never gained any institutional representation. The party announced its self-dissolution in June 2015.

Activities
In 2004, the party contested the European Parliamentary elections, obtaining 1,331 votes in Galicia (0.12%) and 2,516 votes in Spain. In the Galician elections of 2005, 1,749 votes (0.1%) were obtained. In 2005, the party organized a campaign to eliminate symbolic vestiges of Francoist rule from Galicia, presenting their concerns to the Xunta de Galicia. During some demonstrations associated with this campaign, Nós-UP party members were arrested.

Election results

European elections

Galician elections

Local elections

References

Notes

External links
Official website 

Defunct socialist parties in Galicia (Spain)
Secessionist organizations in Europe
Galician nationalist parties
Left-wing nationalist parties